The women's high jump event  at the 2001 IAAF World Indoor Championships was held on March 9.

Results

References
Results

High
High jump at the World Athletics Indoor Championships
2001 in women's athletics